Personal identity number may refer to:
National identification number, used by national authorities.
Personal identification number, or PIN, used for identification for credit card usage and other situations.